The 2011–12 Marist Red Foxes men's basketball team represented Marist College during the 2010–11 NCAA Division I men's basketball season. The Red Foxes, led by fourth year head coach Chuck Martin, played their home games at the McCann Arena and were members of the Metro Atlantic Athletic Conference. They finished the season 14–18, 7–11 in MAAC play to finish eighth place. They lost in the quarterfinals of the MAAC tournament to Iona.

Previous season 

The Red Foxes finished the 2010–11 season 6–27, 3–15 in MAAC play to finish in a tie for ninth place. They advanced to the quarterfinals of the MAAC tournament where they lost to Fairfield.

Roster

Schedule and results

|-
!colspan=9 style=| Regular season

|-
!colspan=9 style=| MAAC tournament

Source

References

Marist
Marist Red Foxes men's basketball seasons
Marist Red Foxes men's basketball
Marist Red Foxes men's basketball